Thomas Stewart Colquhoun Little (27 February 1890 – 1927) an English professional footballer who played for Bradford Park Avenue and Stoke.

Career
Little began his career with his hometown club Ilford and Southend United before joining Football League Second Division side Bradford Park Avenue in 1908. He was a decent forward as a teenager and he helped Bradford gain promotion in 1913–14 scoring 24 goals in 39 games. His career was interrupted by World War I but he returned to Bradford once the League was restored in 1919–20. With Bradford heading for relegation he joined Stoke in 1920–21 where he played 21 times for the "Potters" scoring once against Clapton Orient.

Career statistics
Source:

Honours
 Bradford Park Avenue
 Football League Second Division runner-up: 1913–14

 Stoke
 Football League Second Division runner-up: 1921–22

References

1890 births
1927 deaths
Footballers from Ilford
Association football forwards
English footballers
Ilford F.C. players
Southend United F.C. players
Bradford (Park Avenue) A.F.C. players
Stoke City F.C. players
English Football League players